= Venture equity =

Venture equity is an investment strategy that includes a hybrid of venture capital and private equity approaches. Firms or individuals involved in venture equity acquire struggling startups, make improvements to the companies to help spur growth, and resell them for a profit.

Venture equity firms work with early-stage startups that may have raised seed funding and are generating revenue, but may be unable to achieve the level of growth needed to secure additional funding or attract buyers. Venture equity involves companies with high growth potential, similar to venture capital. Similar to traditional private equity firms, venture equity firms acquire companies and take control in their operation. Venture equity firms invest in sales, marketing and operations in an effort to achieve greater growth.

The term “venture equity”, a portmanteau of “venture capital” and “private equity”, was coined in 2016 by Ed Byrne, a general partner at the firm Scaleworks.

Some of the first firms to use this investment strategy include Scaleworks, Xenon Ventures, Turn/River Capital, and Cache Ventures.
